Miracula is a genus of parasitic protists that parasite diatoms, containing the type species Miracula helgolandica, to which more recently the species Miracula moenusica from the river Main in Frankfurt am Main, Miracula islandica from a shore in the north of Iceland, Miracula einbuarlaekurica from a stremlet in the north of Iceland, and Miracula blauvikensis from the shore at the research station Blávík in the east fjords of Iceland were added. It is the only genus in the family Miraculaceae, of uncertain taxonomic position within the Oomycetes. They're one of the most basal lineages in the phylogeny of Oomycetes.

References

Pseudofungi genera